The Second Battle of Fort Defiance was a military engagement fought during the United States period of the Navajo Wars. On April 29, 1860, about 1,000 Navajo warriors assaulted the United States Army garrison of Fort Defiance in New Mexico Territory, now within present day Arizona. The Navajo achieved a surprise attack but was ultimately repulsed by 150 American defenders of the 3rd Infantry under Captain Oliver L. Shepherd. The Americans formed in the center of the buildings and withstood the Navajo attack. The natives retreated with a loss of around seven dead and several wounded while the Americans suffered four men killed in action and three wounded.

The second Navajo assault on Fort Defiance was the only instance of hostile natives attacking a heavily garrisoned fort subsequent to occupation during the Mexican–American War.<ref name=Twitchell>[https://books.google.com/books?id=VrsUAAAAYAAJ&pg=PA316 "The Leading Facts of New Mexican History, Volume 2] Ralph Emerson Twitchell, Torch Press, 1912, page 316. Retrieved February 6, 2022.</ref> It was one of the largest battles fought within the borders of Arizona. It was also one of the reasons why the militia commander Lieutenant Colonel Manuel Antonio Chaves ordered an unauthorized campaign into Navajo territory in 1860 and 1861.

See also
 Apache Wars
 American Indian Wars

References

 McNitt, Frank. Navajo Wars. Univ. New Mexico, 1972.
 Lavender, David. The Rockies, Revised Edition. New York: Harper & Row, 1975.
 Limerick, Patricia Nelson. The Legacy of Conquest: The Unbroken Past of the American West. New York: W.W. Norton, 1987.
 Locke, Raymond Friday. The Book of the Navajo''. Los Angeles: Mankind Publishing Company, 1992.

Fort Defiance
Fort Defiance
Fort Defiance
Pre-statehood history of Arizona
History of United States expansionism
19th-century military history of the United States
1860 in New Mexico Territory
August 1860 events